Tulchyn (translit. Tul’chyn, old name Nesterwar (from Hungarian Nester - Dniester and war -town), Latin Tulcinum) is a town in Vinnytsia Oblast (province) of western Ukraine, former Podolia. It is the administrative center of Tulchyn Raion (district), and was the chief centre of the Southern Society of the Decembrists, Pavel Pestel was located there during planning of the rebellion. The city is also known for being the home to Ukrainian composer Mykola Leontovych who produced several of this choral masterpieces (including world famous "Carol of the bells") when he lived here. An important landmark of the city is the palace of the Potocki family, built according to the principles of Palladian architecture according to the plans drafted by Joseph Lacroix during the 1780s. Polish patriot Józef Wysocki (general) was born in Tulchin in 1809, author of Pamietnik Jenerala Wysockiego, Dowodcy Legionu Polskiego Na Wegrzech Z Czasu Kampanii Wegierskiej W Roku 1848 i 1849. Population:

History

Polish Tulczyn was first mentioned in 1607. It was a royal city in the Bracław Voivodeship of the Crown of the Kingdom of Poland. In 1609 King Sigismund III Vasa granted the town to Walenty Aleksander Kalinowski. Until 1728 Tulchin was part of the estates of the Polish magnates of the Kalinowski family (other distinguished members of Tulchin family were  Adam Kalinowski and Marcin Kalinowski),  and then passed into the hands of Stanisław Potocki bypassing other Kalinowskis' branch, then in 1734 to Franciszek Salezy Potocki and his son Stanisław Szczęsny Potocki, who was the most memorable and infamous member of the Tulczyn branch of the Potocki family. During the Targowica confederation Tulchin was the headquarters of the confederates. Mieczysław Potocki sold Tulchin to his brother-in-law Grzegorz Strogonow, who sold it to Piotr Oldenburski, who in turn sold it to Russian Imperial Treasury. Ancient archives of the Polish magnate families of Struś, Łaszcz, Mniszech, Modrzewski, Potocki, and Tarło collected at the palace, were lost during these transfers in ownership, while furniture and art collections were shipped to Paris, where Mieczysław Potocki resided. After the Kyiv-Odessa train line had been built Tulchin went into economic decay. Prior to October Revolution Tulchin was home a large Jewish population, and there were two trade fairs, July 24 and October 1 each year, and separate 26 market days annually. Between 1917 and 1920 the town frequently changed ownership, between the Poles, the Bolsheviks, White Russians and Ukrainians.

During World War II, the German conquerors turned over Tulchyn and the surrounding area to Romanian control.  After first being confined to a ghetto, most Jews from Tulchyn were deported to the nearby Pechora concentration camp where they perished. The area was liberated by the Red Army in March 1944.

The current estimated population is around 13,500 (as of 2005).

Gallery

Personalities 

Stanisław Trembecki (1739–1812), Polish poet
 Włodzimierz Potocki (1789-1812), Polish Count, artillery colonel
 Mieczysław Potocki (1799-1878), Polish magnate, owner of estates in Tulczyn, one of the richest Poles in the 19th century
 Alexander Veltman (1800-1870), the Russian writer, was stationed here for some years (and met Pushkin here)
 Józef Wysocki (1809-1873), Polish military commander, general of Polish Army, participant of Polish National Uprisings and the Hungarian Revolution of 1848
 Marian Dziewicki  (1872-1935), Polish lawyer, President of Wilno, local government activist
 Bronisław Matyjewicz-Maciejewicz (1882-1911), Polish aviator 
 Mykola Leontovych (1877-1921), the Ukrainian composer (who composed the Carol of the Bells), lived here
 Sophie Tucker, Ukrainian-born American singer, comedian, actress, and radio personality

References

Notes

Sources
 Słownik geograficzny Królestwa Polskiego i innych krajów słowiańskich,(1880–1914) Tom (vol.) XII, pages 611–613.

Cities in Vinnytsia Oblast
Polish–Lithuanian Commonwealth
1607 establishments in the Polish–Lithuanian Commonwealth
Bratslav Voivodeship
Bratslavsky Uyezd
Cities of district significance in Ukraine
Tulchyn Raion